The Grand Canyon National Park is a U.S. National Park located in the state of Arizona.  The Park encompasses the Grand Canyon and the surrounding rim areas.  The Park maintains an intricate trail system both above and below the rims of the canyon.  To properly maintain and supervise the many trails and campgrounds in the backcountry of the Grand Canyon, Park implemented a system of zoning the different areas of the canyon and the surrounding rim area into backcountry "use areas," designated by a two-letter, one-number code system. 

This code is used when applying for the required permits for any backcountry overnight camping and backpacking.  Permits must be purchased from the Park for any overnight camping done in the within its borders.  When applying for a permit, the permit-holder declares his/her intended camping schedule, by using the code for each area he/she intends on camping in, and stating how many days he/she will remain in the area.     

The Park also created rules and regulations to help protect and preserve the Grand Canyon.  These rules and regulations, such as Leave No Trace,  range from limits on the amount of campers in one area, to rules that the campers must follow for safety and protection of the wildlife and wilderness.  This system helps to assure the Grand Canyon remains one of the world's great wonders.

Backcountry Regulations

Camping Limits

Backcountry Zones
 Corridor This type of trail is recommended for new Grand Canyon hikers.  There is a high density of hikers in an established area.  There are permanent structures, bathrooms, clean water, trail markings, bridges, emergency phones, and ranger stations.
 Threshold This type of trail is recommended for experienced Grand Canyon hikers only.  There is a medium density of hikers in a fairly established area.  There are non-permanent structures, bathrooms, signs, although most trails are unmaintained and there is minimal water.
 Primitive This type of trail is recommended for highly experienced Grand Canyon hikers only.  There is a low density of hikers with very limited establishment.  There are no structures and all the trails and routes are unmaintained and there is very little water present.
 Wilderness This type of trail is recommended for expert Grand Canyon hikers only.  There is a potential for little to no contact with other hikers.  Advanced route finding ability is required, as most trails are indistinct or non-existent and there is little to no water.  

*Special permits are required from the Navajo Tribal Parks Department for the Marble Canyon use areas:SF9, SI9, SH9, SG9 and the portion of the use area BA9 north of the confluence of the Little Colorado River.

See also

 The Grand Canyon 
 List of trails in Grand Canyon National Park 
 Colorado River

References
 Grand Canyon Explorer
 National Geographic Maps Trails Illustrated: Grand Canyon National Park
 Camp Type

External links 
 Grand Canyon National Park Backcountry Permit
 Grand Canyon National Park Backcountry Permit Request Form
 Backcountry Use Areas - Interactive Map
 Map of Use Areas

Grand Canyon
Camping in the United States